ADP-ribosylation factor-like protein 11 is a protein that in humans is encoded by the ARL11 gene.

References

External links

Further reading